The formation of cells, sometimes called cellularization (USA, or cellularisation, GB), remains a fundamental field of research. 
There are different hypotheses dealing with the origin and development of the first cells on this planet 

By contrast, the formation of cells in extant organisms (Bacteria, Archaea, Eucarya) has been subject to direct investigations.

Formation of the first cells 
There are several hypotheses, see main article History of life (chapter "Origin of Life"). Here two examples:

RNA world hypothesis 
Under the RNA world hypothesis a hypothetical lipid-based bubble-like structure protected RNA and was the ancestral precursor cell (last universal common ancestor – LUCA) of the three domains of life.

Iron-sulfur world hypothesis 
Under the Iron-Sulfur world hypothesis according to Wächtershäuser the develpoment of cells occurs in several stages. It begins with the formation of primitive lipids (e.g. fatty acids or isoprenoid  acids) in the surface metabolism. These lipids accumulate on or in the mineral base. This lipophilizes the outer or inner surfaces of the mineral base, which promotes condensation reactions over hydrolytic reactions by lowering the  activity of water and protons. 

In the next stage lipid membranes are formed. While still anchored to the mineral base they form a semi-cell bounded partly by the mineral base and partly by the membrane. Further lipid evolution leads to self-supporting lipid membranes and closed cells. The earliest closed cells are pre-cells (sensu Kandler) because they allow frequent exchange of genetic material (e.g. by fusions). 

According to Kandler's pre-cell theory), there was no ancestral “first cell“ nor a first individual precursor cell. He introduced the term cellularization for his concept of a successive development of cells by a process of evolutionary improvements. 

In this scenario the (bio)chemical origin, early metabolism and evolution of life led to diversification through the development of a multiphenotypical population of pre-cells, from which the founder groups A, B, C and then, from them, the precursor cells (here named proto-cells) of the three domains of life emerged successively.
Kandler’s pre-cell theory is supported by Wächtershäuser. 

A scheme of the pre-cell scenario is presented in the adjacent figure, where essential evolutionary improvements are indicated by numbers. 

Kandler’s concept may explain the quasi-random distribution of evolutionarily important features among the three domains and, at the same time, the existence of the most basic biochemical features (genetic code, set of protein amino acids etc.) in all three domains (unity of life), as well as the close relationship between the Archaea and the Eucarya. 

The protection of fragile primordial life forms from their environment by the development of envelopes (i.e. membranes, walls) was an essential improvement. For instance, the development of rigid cell walls by the invention and elaboration of peptidoglycan in bacteria (domain Bacteria) may have been a prerequisite for their successful survival, radiation and colonisation of virtually all habitats of the geosphere and hydrosphere. 

A coevolution of the biosphere and the geosphere is suggested: “The evolving life could venture into a larger variety of habitats, even into microaerobic habitats in shallow, illuminated surface waters. The continuous changes in the physical environment on the aging and cooling Earth led to further diversification of habitats and favored opportunistic radiation of primitive life into numerous phenotypes on the basis of each of the different chemolithoautotrophies. Concomitantly, with the accumulation of organic matter derived from chemolithoautotrophic life, opportunistic and obligate heterotrophic life may also have developed”.

Formation of cells in extant organisms (Bacteria, Archaea, Eucarya) 
Formation of cells (including cell division, replication, proliferation mechanisms) is different in the three domains of life. As far as we know nearly all multicellular organisms emerged from the domain Eucarya.

The syncytial theory 
The syncytial theory of cellularization, also known as the syncytial theory or ciliate-acoel theory, is a theory to explain the origin of Metazoa. The idea was proposed by Hadži (1953) and Hanson (1977).

The cellularization (syncytial) theory states that metazoans evolved from a unicellular ciliate with multiple nuclei that went through cellularization. Firstly, the ciliate developed a ventral mouth for feeding and all nuclei moved to one side of the cell. Secondly, an epithelium was created by membranes forming barriers between the nuclei. In this way, a multicellular organism was created from one multinucleate cell (syncytium).

Arguments (synclital theory)

Turbellarian flatworms 
By several cellularization processes, the ciliate ancestor evolved into the currently known turbellarian flatworms, which are therefore the most primitive metazoans according to the theory. The theory of cellularization is based on the large similarities between ciliates and flatworms. Both ciliates and flatworms have cilia, are bilaterally symmetric, and syncytial. Therefore, the theory assumes that bilateral symmetry is more primitive than radial symmetry. However, current biological evidence shows that the most primitive forms of metazoans show radial symmetry, and thus radially symmetrical animals like cnidaria cannot be derived from bilateral flatworms.

By concluding that the first multicellular animals were flatworms, it is also suggested that simpler organisms as sponges, ctenophores and cnidarians would have derived from  more complex animals. However, most current molecular research has shown that sponges are the most primitive metazoans.

Germ layers are formed simultaneously 
The syncytial theory rejects the theory of germ layers. During the development of the turbellaria (Acoela), three regions are formed without the formation of germ layers. From this, it was concluded that the germ layers are simultaneously formed during the cellularization process. This is in contrast to germ layer theory in which ectoderm, endoderm and mesoderm (in more complex animals) build up the embryo.

Drosophila melanogaster development
Evidence for the syncytial theory can also be found in the development of Drosophila melanogaster. First 13 nuclear divisions take place forming a syncytial blastoderm consisting of approximately 6000 nuclei. During the later gastrulation stage, membranes are formed between the nuclei, and cellularization is completed.

Criticism (synclital theory)

The macro and micronucleus of Ciliates 
There is a lot of evidence against ciliates being the metazoan ancestor.  Ciliates have two types of nuclei: a micronucleus which is used as germline nucleus and a macronucleus which regulates the vegetative growth. This division of nuclei is a unique feature of the ciliates and is not found in any other members of the animal kingdom. Therefore, it would be unlikely that ciliates are indeed the ancestors of the metazoans. This is confirmed by molecular phylogenetic research. Ciliates were never found close to animals in any molecular phylogeny.

Flagellated sperm 
Furthermore, the syncytial theory cannot explain the flagellated sperm of metazoans. Since the ciliate ancestor does not have any flagella and it is unlikely that the flagella arose as a de novo trait in metazoans,  the syncytial theory makes it almost impossible to explain the origin of flagellated sperm.

Due to both the lack of molecular and morphological evidence for this theory, the alternative colonial theory of Haeckel, is currently gaining widespread acceptance.

For more theories see main article Multicellular organisms.

See also 

 Multicellular organism
 Ciliate
 Evolutionary biology

References

Biological evolution